The 1996 Chatham Cup was the 69th annual nationwide knockout football competition in New Zealand.

Up to the last 16 of the competition, the cup was run in three regions (northern, central, and southern), with an open draw from the quarter-finals on. National League teams received a bye until the fourth round (last 32). In all, 127 teams took part in the competition, which consisted of a preliminary round and five rounds proper before quarter-finals, semi-finals, and a final.

The 1996 final
For the second year in a row, Waitakere City won the league/cup double - the only team to have achieved this two seasons running. They also became only the third team to win the Chatham Cup three years in a row, having won in both 1994 and 1995. 

The Jack Batty Memorial Cup is awarded to the player adjudged to have made to most positive impact in the Chatham Cup final. The winner of the 1996 Jack Batty Memorial Cup was Mark Foy of Mount Wellington.

Results

Third round

* Won on penalties by Manurewa (4-3) and Wanganui East (3-2)

Fourth round

Fifth round

* Won on penalties by Tawa (4-2)

Quarter-finals

Semi-finals

Final

References

Rec.Sport.Soccer Statistics Foundation New Zealand 1996 page
UltimateNZSoccer website 1996 Chatham Cup page

Chatham Cup
Chatham Cup
Chatham Cup
Chat